Stolen is a stealth game video game developed by British developer Blue 52 and published by Hip Games for the PlayStation 2, Xbox, and Microsoft Windows in 2005.

Gameplay 
Stolen is a stealth game in which the protagonist Anya has several hi-tech gadgets to assist her in her cat burglar escapades, including night vision goggles and a multi-use dart gun. Because of her personal moral criminal code, Anya has no lethal arms at her disposal and the player cannot kill any of the guards and other enemies she encounters, but can only knock them unconscious for a brief moment. Anya is assisted by the computer expert Louie Palmer, who communicates with her through an earpiece. The GameSpot review noted the game's "Prince of Persia-inspired feats," but opined "the only difficult part about Stolen is finding the patience to actually remain hidden when it's easier to just charge through the levels."

Plot 
The player assumes the role of Anya Romanov, an acrobatic, high-tech professional thief living in the futuristic dark metropolis Forge City, (USA). Her initial mission is to infiltrate a high-security museum and steal items therein. Later on, Anya is framed for murder she did not commit. Eventually, she finds out about a sinister conspiracy involving a ruthless corrupt politician Richard Killian and her own deadly female ninja rival known only as Breeze.

Reception 

The PlayStation 2 and Xbox versions received "mixed" reviews, while the PC version received "generally unfavorable reviews", according to the review aggregation website Metacritic.

References

External links 
 Official website (archived)
 

2005 video games
Action-adventure games
Cyberpunk video games
Organized crime video games
Neo-noir video games
Lua (programming language)-scripted video games
PlayStation 2 games
Stealth video games
Video games developed in the United Kingdom
Video games featuring female protagonists
Windows games
Xbox games